Przykop may refer to the following places:
Przykop, Subcarpathian Voivodeship (south-east Poland)
Przykop, Giżycko County in Warmian-Masurian Voivodeship (north Poland)
Przykop, Olsztyn County in Warmian-Masurian Voivodeship (north Poland)